Vascular dementia (VaD) is dementia caused by problems in the supply of blood to the brain, typically a series of minor strokes, leading to worsening cognitive abilities, the decline occurring piecemeal. The term refers to a syndrome consisting of a complex interaction of cerebrovascular disease and risk factors that lead to changes in brain structures due to strokes and lesions, resulting in changes in cognition. The temporal relationship between a stroke and cognitive deficits is needed to make the diagnosis. 

ICD-11 lists vascular dementia as dementia due to cerebrovascular disease. DSM-5 lists vascular dementia as either major or mild vascular neurocognitive disorder.

Signs and symptoms
Differentiating dementia syndromes can be challenging, due to the frequently overlapping clinical features and related underlying pathology. Mixed dementia, involving two types of dementia can occur, in particular, Alzheimer's disease often co-occurs with vascular dementia.

People with vascular dementia present with progressive cognitive impairment, acutely or sub-acutely as in mild cognitive impairment, frequently step-wise, after multiple cerebrovascular events (strokes). Some people may appear to improve between events and decline after further silent strokes. A rapidly deteriorating condition may lead to death from a stroke, heart disease, or infection.

The disease is described as both a mental and behavioural disorder within the ICD-11. Signs and symptoms are cognitive, motor, behavioral, and for a significant proportion of patients, also affective. These changes typically occur over a period of 5–10 years. Signs are typically the same as in other dementias, but mainly include cognitive decline and memory impairment of sufficient severity as to interfere with activities of daily living, sometimes with presence of focal neurologic signs, and evidence of features consistent with cerebrovascular disease on brain imaging (CT or MRI). The neurologic signs localizing to certain areas of the brain that can be observed are hemiparesis, bradykinesia, hyperreflexia, extensor plantar reflexes, ataxia, pseudobulbar palsy, as well as gait problems and swallowing difficulties. People have patchy deficits in terms of cognitive testing. They tend to have better free recall and fewer recall intrusions when compared with patients with Alzheimer's disease. In the more severely affected patients, or patients affected by infarcts in Wernicke's or Broca's areas, specific problems with speaking called dysarthria and aphasias may be present.

In small vessel disease, the frontal lobes are often affected. Consequently, patients with vascular dementia tend to perform worse than their Alzheimer's disease counterparts in frontal lobe tasks, such as verbal fluency, and may present with frontal lobe problems: apathy, abulia (lack of will or initiative), problems with attention, orientation, and urinary incontinence. They tend to exhibit more perseverative behavior. VaD patients may also present with general slowing of processing ability, difficulty shifting sets, and impairment in abstract thinking. Apathy early in the disease is more suggestive of vascular dementia.

Rare genetic disorders that cause vascular lesions in the brain have other presentation patterns. As a rule, they tend to occur earlier in life and have a more aggressive course. In addition, infectious disorders, such as syphilis, can cause arterial damage, strokes, and bacterial inflammation of the brain.

Causes
Vascular dementia can be caused by ischemic or hemorrhagic infarcts affecting multiple brain areas, including the anterior cerebral artery territory, the parietal lobes, or the cingulate gyrus. On rare occasion, infarcts in the hippocampus or thalamus are the cause of dementia. A history of stroke increases the risk of developing dementia by around 70%, and recent stroke increases the risk by around 120%. Brain vascular lesions can also be the result of diffuse cerebrovascular disease, such as small vessel disease.

Risk factors for vascular dementia include age, hypertension, smoking, hypercholesterolemia, diabetes mellitus, cardiovascular disease, and cerebrovascular disease. Other risk factors include geographic origin, genetic predisposition, and prior strokes.

Vascular dementia can sometimes be triggered by cerebral amyloid angiopathy, which involves accumulation of beta amyloid plaques in the walls of the cerebral arteries, leading to breakdown and rupture of the vessels. Since amyloid plaques are a characteristic feature of Alzheimer's disease, vascular dementia may occur as a consequence. Cerebral amyloid angiopathy can, however, appear in people with no prior dementia condition. Amyloid beta accumulation is often present in cognitively normal elderly people.

Two reviews of 2018 and 2019 found potentially an association between celiac disease and vascular dementia.

Diagnosis
Several specific diagnostic criteria can be used to diagnose vascular dementia, including the Diagnostic and Statistical Manual of Mental Disorders, Fourth Edition (DSM-IV) criteria, the International Classification of Diseases, Tenth Edition (ICD-10) criteria, the National Institute of Neurological Disorders and Stroke criteria, Association Internationale pour la Recherche et l'Enseignement en Neurosciences (NINDS-AIREN) criteria, the Alzheimer's Disease Diagnostic and Treatment Center criteria, and the Hachinski Ischemic Score (after Vladimir Hachinski).

The recommended investigations for cognitive impairment include: blood tests (for anemia, vitamin deficiency, thyrotoxicosis, infection, etc.), chest X-Ray, ECG, and neuroimaging, preferably a scan with a functional or metabolic sensitivity beyond a simple CT or MRI. When available as a diagnostic tool, single photon emission computed tomography (SPECT) and positron emission tomography (PET) neuroimaging may be used to confirm a diagnosis of multi-infarct dementia in conjunction with evaluations involving mental status examination. In a person already having dementia, SPECT appears to be superior in differentiating multi-infarct dementia from Alzheimer's disease, compared to the usual mental testing and medical history analysis. Advances have led to the proposal of new diagnostic criteria.

The screening blood tests typically include full blood count, liver function tests, thyroid function tests, lipid profile, erythrocyte sedimentation rate, C reactive protein, syphilis serology, calcium serum level, fasting glucose, urea, electrolytes, vitamin B-12, and folate. In selected patients, HIV serology and certain autoantibody testing may be done.

Mixed dementia is diagnosed when people have evidence of Alzheimer's disease and cerebrovascular disease, either clinically or based on neuro-imaging evidence of ischemic lesions.

Pathology
Gross examination of the brain may reveal noticeable lesions and damage to blood vessels. Accumulation of various substances such as lipid deposits and clotted blood appear on microscopic views. The white matter is most affected, with noticeable atrophy (tissue loss), in addition to calcification of the arteries. Microinfarcts may also be present in the gray matter (cerebral cortex), sometimes in large numbers.
Although atheroma of the major cerebral arteries is typical in vascular dementia, smaller vessels and arterioles are mainly affected.

Prevention
Early detection and accurate diagnosis are important, as vascular dementia is at least partially preventable. Ischemic changes in the brain are irreversible, but the patient with vascular dementia can demonstrate periods of stability or even mild improvement. Since stroke is an essential part of vascular dementia, the goal is to prevent new strokes. This is attempted through reduction of stroke risk factors, such as high blood pressure, high blood lipid levels, atrial fibrillation, or diabetes mellitus. Meta-analyses have found that medications for high blood pressure are effective at prevention of pre-stroke dementia, which means that high blood pressure treatment should be started early. These medications include angiotensin converting enzyme inhibitors, diuretics, calcium channel blockers, sympathetic nerve inhibitors, angiotensin II receptor antagonists or adrenergic antagonists. Elevated lipid levels, including HDL, were found to increase risk of vascular dementia. However, six large recent reviews showed that therapy with statin drugs was ineffective in treatment or prevention of this dementia. Aspirin is a medication that is commonly prescribed for prevention of strokes and heart attacks; it is also frequently given to patients with dementia. However, its efficacy in slowing progression of dementia or improving cognition has not been supported by studies. Smoking cessation and Mediterranean diet have not been found to help patients with cognitive impairment; physical activity was consistently the most effective method of preventing cognitive decline.

Treatment
Currently, there are no medications that have been approved specifically for prevention or treatment of vascular dementia. The use of medications for treatment of Alzheimer's dementia, such as cholinesterase inhibitors and memantine, has shown small improvement of cognition in vascular dementia. This is most likely due to the drugs' actions on co-existing AD-related pathology. Multiple studies found a small benefit in VaD treatment with: memantine, a non-competitive N-methyl-D-aspartate (NMDA) receptor antagonist; cholinesterase inhibitors galantamine, donepezil, rivastigmine; Studies have been proposed to evaluate whether an extract of Ginkgo biloba EGb761 improves cognition, daily activities, and quality of life in treating vascular dementia.

In those with celiac disease or non-celiac gluten sensitivity, a strict gluten-free diet may relieve symptoms of mild cognitive impairment. It should be started as soon as possible. There is no evidence that a gluten free diet is useful against advanced dementia. People with no digestive symptoms are less likely to receive early diagnosis and treatment.

General management of dementia includes referral to community services, aid with judgment and decision-making regarding legal and ethical issues (e.g., driving, capacity, advance directives), and consideration of caregiver stress. Behavioral and affective symptoms deserve special consideration in this patient group. These problems tend to resist conventional psychopharmacological treatment, and often lead to hospital admission and placement in permanent care.

Prognosis
Many studies have been conducted to determine average survival of patients with dementia. The studies were frequently small and limited, which caused contradictory results in the connection of mortality to the type of dementia and the patient's gender. A very large study conducted in Netherlands in 2015 found that the one-year mortality was three to four times higher in patients after their first referral to a day clinic for dementia, when  compared to the general population. If the patient was hospitalized for dementia, the mortality was even higher than in patients hospitalized for cardiovascular disease.  Vascular dementia was found to have either comparable or worse survival rates when compared to Alzheimer's Disease; another very large 2014 Swedish study found that the prognosis for VaD patients was worse for male and older patients.

Unlike Alzheimer's disease, which weakens the patient, causing them to succumb to bacterial infections like pneumonia, vascular dementia can be a direct cause of death due to the possibility of a fatal interruption in the brain's blood supply.

Epidemiology
Vascular dementia is the second-most-common form of dementia after Alzheimer's disease (AD) in older adults. The prevalence of the illness is 1.5% in Western countries and approximately 2.2% in Japan. It accounts for 50% of all dementias in Japan, 20% to 40% in Europe and 15% in Latin America. 25% of stroke patients develop new-onset dementia within one year of their stroke. One study found that in the United States, the prevalence of vascular dementia in all people over the age of 71 is 2.43%, and another found that the prevalence of the dementias doubles with every 5.1 years of age. The incidence peaks between the fourth and the seventh decades of life and 80% of patients have a history of hypertension.

A recent meta-analysis identified 36 studies of prevalent stroke (1.9 million participants) and 12 studies of incident stroke (1.3 million participants). For prevalent stroke, the pooled hazard ratio for all-cause dementia was 1.69 (95% confidence interval: 1.49–1.92; P < .00001; I2 = 87%). For incident stroke, the pooled risk ratio was 2.18 (95% confidence interval: 1.90–2.50; P < .00001; I2 = 88%). Study characteristics did not modify these associations, with the exception of sex, which explained 50.2% of between-study heterogeneity for prevalent stroke. These results confirm that stroke is a strong, independent, and potentially modifiable risk factor for all-cause dementia.

See also
 Binswanger's disease
 Cerebrovascular accident

References

External links
 Multi-Infarct Dementia Fact Sheet at ninds.nih.gov
 American Academy of Neurology (December 21, 2007). "Walking and Moderate Exercise Help Prevent Dementia". ScienceDaily. Retrieved December 21, 2007, from https://www.sciencedaily.com/releases/2007/12/071219202948.htm

Cognitive disorders
Dementia
Learning disabilities
Mental disorders due to brain damage